State Route 132 (SR 132) is an  state highway in Blount and Etowah counties in the U.S. state of Alabama. The western terminus of the highway is at an intersection with SR 75 north of downtown Oneonta. The eastern terminus of the highway is at an intersection with U.S. Route 278 (US 278) east of Walnut Grove.

Route description
SR 132 is a two-lane highway for its entire length. Its main purpose is to lead motorists from Oneonta to Attalla and Gadsden without travelling via SR 75 or US 231 and Interstate 59 (I-59). It travels in a generally northeastward trajectory as it heads from Oneonta and travels through rural Blount County. Altoona is the only town the highway travels through.

Major intersections

See also

References

External links

132
Transportation in Blount County, Alabama
Transportation in Etowah County, Alabama